Høilandet is a Dano-Norwegian word meaning the highlands. It is the old name of:

Høylandet municipality in Nord-Trøndelag, Norway
Hølonda municipality in Sør-Trøndelag, Norway (now a part of Melhus)

See also
Høyland